The James Dean Story is a 1957 American documentary.

Released two years after Dean's death, the Warner Bros. Pictures release chronicles his short life and career through black-and-white still photographs, interviews with the aunt and uncle who raised him, his paternal grandparents, a New York City cabdriver friend, and the owner of his favorite Los Angeles restaurant, and outtakes from East of Eden, footage of the opening night of Giant, and Dean's public service announcement for safe driving from Warner Bros. Presents.

Martin Gabel's narration was written by Stewart Stern, who scripted Dean's Rebel Without a Cause. A directing credit was shared by Robert Altman and George W. George.

Soundtrack
The music accompanying The James Dean Story was composed and conducted by Leith Stevens, and featured Tommy Sands singing the theme song, "Let Me Be Loved". A tie-in album, Theme Music from "The James Dean Story", released by World Pacific Records in 1957, featured the jazz trumpeter, Chet Baker, and the flutist and saxophonist, Bud Shank.

The film is available on DVD.

References

External links
 

1957 films
American black-and-white films
Documentary films about actors
Films directed by Robert Altman
Warner Bros. films
Cultural depictions of James Dean